Norton Canes is a civil parish in the district of Cannock Chase, Staffordshire, England.  It contains three buildings that are recorded in the National Heritage List for England.  Of these, two are listed at Grade II*, the middle grade, and the other is at Grade II, the lowest grade.  The parish contains the villages of Norton Canes and Little Wyrley, and is otherwise rural.  The listed buildings 
are a country house and an associated barn, and a church.


Key

Buildings

References

Citations

Sources

Lists of listed buildings in Staffordshire